Redondo is a municipality in the District of Évora in Portugal. The population in 2016 was 6, 567, in an area of 369.51 km2.

History 
The area of Redondo municipality contains an important megalithic cluster, including the Anta da Vidigueira, Anta da Candeeira and Anta de Colmeeiro dolmens, or neolithic burial chambers.

In 1250, a foral (charter) attributed to King D. Afonso III was issued to Redondo. At the same time, the king ordered the construction of a castle over the ruins of the ancient Roman fortress. Later, the town was ruled by the Count of Redondo starting in the 1500s.

Administration 
The current Mayor is António José Recto, having been elected in 2013 as head of the same independent list his predecessor, Alfredo Falamino Barroso, previously commanded. The municipal holiday is Easter Monday.

Parishes
Administratively, the municipality is divided into 2 civil parishes (freguesias):
 Montoito
 Redondo

Notable people 
 Bruno Pires (born 1981) a Portuguese former professional road bicycle racer, who competed professionally between 2002 and 2016

See also
Redondo DOC

References

Municipalities of Évora District